Joseph Annor Aziz  (born 7 January 1974 in Accra) is a retired Ghanaian professional footballer who played for several clubs in Latin America and Europe and the Ghana national football team.

Career 
In 1995, Aziz moved to Poland to play for Legia Warsaw.  In October 1995 Aziz joined Olimpia-Lechia Gdańsk, the short lived team created by the merger of Lechia Gdańsk and Olimpia Poznań, before leaving the club in December. During his 3-month spell at Lechia he made two appearances. He played for Polonia Warsaw for the 1996–97 season, before moving to Sporting Cristal of Peru. He spent the following seasons in Germany, enjoying success with SV Eintracht Trier 05.

International 
Aziz made twelve appearances for the Ghana national football team, scoring seven goals.

References

1974 births
Living people
Ghanaian footballers
Ghana international footballers
Legia Warsaw players
Lechia Gdańsk players
Polonia Warsaw players
Sporting Cristal footballers
SV Eintracht Trier 05 players
FC Augsburg players
Stuttgarter Kickers players
Expatriate footballers in Poland
Ghanaian expatriates in Poland
2. Bundesliga players
Association football defenders